Leo Bohan (16 September 1929– 10 November 2016) was an Australian rules footballer who played with Hawthorn in the Victorian Football League (VFL).

Notes

External links 

2016 deaths
1929 births
Australian rules footballers from Victoria (Australia)
Hawthorn Football Club players